Harry Duquesne "Duke" Markell (born Makowsky, August 17, 1923 – June 14, 1984) was a French-born professional baseball player, a right-handed pitcher whose career extended from 1945–1957, almost exclusively in minor league baseball. He appeared in five Major League games for the St. Louis Browns in the closing weeks of the  season.

Born in Paris, France, he moved to The Bronx, New York City with his family when he was seven years old. He was Jewish.

Baseball career
Markell was in his seventh pro season when the Browns gave him his MLB opportunity. Although he had lost 19 games that summer for the Oklahoma City Indians of the Double-A Texas League, he had compiled a good 2.77 earned run average.

Markell earned both of his Major League decisions in his two starting assignments. In his first, on September 16 at Shibe Park, he allowed seven hits (including home runs by Gus Zernial and Eddie Joost) and seven earned runs to take the loss in a 7–1 victory by the Philadelphia Athletics. In his second start on September 27, however, he threw a complete game, 7–4 victory over the Detroit Tigers at Sportsman's Park, outpitching veteran Tiger right-hander Fred Hutchinson. Although he gave up another homer, this time to Johnny Groth, Markell scattered eight hits and only three runs were earned.

Altogether, he gave up 25 hits and 20 bases on balls, striking out ten, in 21⅓ innings of big league action. After his brief trial with the Browns, Markell returned to the minor leagues, where he appeared in 508 games pitched and compiled a 154–142 record.

In the early 1960s, the retired Jewish former major league baseball pitcher played outfield for The Free Sons of Israel lodge softball team "Mt. Horeb." He was a regular on the team which played on the Randall's Island softball fields in New York City. He died in Fort Lauderdale, Florida at the age of 60 in 1984.

References

External links

1923 births
1984 deaths
French emigrants to the United States
20th-century French Jews
Charleston Senators players
Danville Leafs players
Hickory Rebels players
Indianapolis Indians players
Jewish American baseball players
Jewish Major League Baseball players
Major League Baseball pitchers
Major League Baseball players from France
Manchester Giants players
Oklahoma City Indians players
Portsmouth Cubs players
Rochester Red Wings players
St. Louis Browns players
Schenectady Blue Jays players
Seaford Eagles players
Sportspeople from the Bronx
Baseball players from New York City
Sportspeople from Paris
Syracuse Chiefs players
Toronto Maple Leafs (International League) players
Utica Blue Sox players
20th-century American Jews